Cycling was contested at the 1994 Asian Games in Hiroshima, Japan from October 9 to October 15.

Medalists

Road

Men

Women

Track

Men

Women

Medal table

References 
 New Straits Times, October 9–16, 1994
 Results

External links 
 Olympic Council of Asia

 
1994 Asian Games events
1994
Asian Games
1994 Asian Games
1994 in road cycling
1994 in track cycling